Dewey Alexander Mayhew (December 21, 1898 – January 6, 1974) was an American football and baseball coach. He coached high school football at Marlin and Abilene, before serving as head coach at Texas College of Arts and Industries—now known as Texas A&M University–Kingsville—from 1946 to 1953. Mayhew won to state championships at Abilene (1928, 1931) and left as the all-time winningest coach with a record of 97–36–11, but was passed in 2007 by current Abilene coach Steve Warren. He died of congestive heart failure in 1974.

Head coaching record

College football

References

External links
 

1898 births
1974 deaths
Southwestern Pirates baseball coaches
Southwestern Pirates football coaches
Texas A&M–Kingsville Javelinas athletic directors
Texas A&M–Kingsville Javelinas football coaches
High school football coaches in Texas
People from Coryell County, Texas
Coaches of American football from Texas
Players of American football from Texas